Ahmadabad (also Romanized as Aḩmadābād) is a village in Ahmadabad Rural District, Hasanabad District, Eqlid County, Fars Province, Iran. At the 2006 census, its population was 628, in 134 families.

References 

Populated places in Eqlid County